Events from the year 1628 in France

Incumbents
 Monarch – Louis XIII

Events
Siege of La Rochelle

Births

Full date missing
Charles Perrault, writer (died 1703).
Claire-Clémence de Maillé-Brézé, noblewoman (died 1694)
François-Henri de Montmorency, duc de Luxembourg, general and marshal of France (died 1695)

Deaths

 16 October – François de Malherbe, poet, critic and translator (born 1555)

Full date missing
Pierre Dugua, Sieur de Mons, merchant, explorer and colonizer (born c.1558)
Simon Goulart, theologian, humanist and poet (born 1543)
François de Sourdis, prelate, archbishop (born 1574)
Nicolas des Escuteaux, novelist

See also

References

1620s in France